Harry Albert Curtis (February 19, 1883 – August 1, 1951) was a catcher in Major League Baseball who played briefly for the New York Giants during the  season. He threw right-handed (batting side unknown). A native of Portland, Maine, he attended University of Notre Dame and Syracuse University.

Little is known about this player on a Giants uniform. Curtis was 23 years old when he entered the majors on September 27, 1899, appearing in 11 games as a backup for the team's regular catcher Roger Bresnahan. Parker posted a .222 batting average (2-for-9) with two runs, one RBI, two stolen bases, and a .364 on-base percentage. He played his final game on October 5, and never appeared in a major-league game again.

In 1908, Curtis served as the first bench coach of the Notre Dame Fighting Irish baseball team.

Curtis died in Evanston, Illinois, at the age of 68.

See also
1907 New York Giants season

References

External links
Baseball Reference
Retrosheet

1883 births
1951 deaths
New York Giants (NL) players
Major League Baseball catchers
Baseball players from Maine
Sportspeople from Portland, Maine
Seattle Siwashes players
Bradford Drillers players
Montreal Royals players
Jersey City Skeeters players
Toronto Maple Leafs (International League) players
Notre Dame Fighting Irish baseball coaches
Notre Dame Fighting Irish baseball players
Syracuse Orangemen baseball players
Baseball coaches from Maine